Masatsune (written: , ,  or ) is a masculine Japanese given name. Notable people with the name include:

, Japanese poet
, Japanese daimyō
, Japanese daimyō
, Japanese politician
, Japanese swordsman

Japanese masculine given names